RG41, is a South African 8x8 armored fighting vehicle (AFV) with mine resistant protection  developed by Land Systems OMC, a subsidiary of BAE Systems. The RG41 was designed as an affordable modern AFV can be utilized in a variety of roles, including infantry section vehicle, a command vehicle, an ambulance, recovery vehicle and engineer vehicle.
Its large payload capability allows additional armour to be added to the RG41 and a variety of weapon systems such as the Alliant Techsystems's 25mm M242 Bushmaster mounted in a tactical response turret, the TRT-25 remote weapon station (RWS).

History
Land Systems OMC, a subdivision of BAE Systems in South Africa, began development of the RG41 in early 2008 as a private venture after seeing a need for an affordable combat system. To meet this requirement, the RG41 employs an ITAR (International Tariff in Arms Regulation) free design and consists of commercial off-the-shelf (COTS) components  that are not subject to US International Traffic in Arms Regulations.

Specifications 
RG41 is an AFV where the driver is seat alone on the front left side of the vehicle. Some weapons can be add to it, including 25 or 30 mm cannon. At Africa Aerospace and Defense, RG41 was fitted with a turret armed with 30 x 173 cannon and a co axial 7.62 mm

With a GVW around 30 tonnes, this vehicle stay easily mobile thank to it 8x8 facilities.

References

External links
RG41 Fact Sheet
BAE Systems RG41 Armoured Vehicle Unveiled

BAE Systems land vehicles
Armoured personnel carriers of South Africa
Military vehicles introduced in the 2010s
Armoured personnel carriers of the post–Cold War period
Eight-wheeled vehicles